Pityilu Island is part of Manus Province in northern Papua New Guinea and part of the Admiralty Islands. It is off the northern coast of Manus Island and is  nearly 4.8 km long and varies in width from 76 to 198 metres.

History
Pityilu Island was occupied by the Imperial Japanese forces in 1942.

On 30 March 1944, the island was assaulted by the reinforced 1st Squadron of 7th Cavalry of the United States Army. 59 Imperial Japanese were killed and 8 cavalrymen were killed with 6 were wounded in the assault.

Pityilu Island was selected to become an airstrip for the use of the United States Navy with a Rest & Recreation facility designed to accommodate up to 10,000 servicemen. The facilities were constructed by the 140th Naval Construction Battalion in June 1944. Pityilu Airstrip consisted of a single runway, made of crushed coral  x . that was built by the 71st CB as part of Manus Naval Base. The Navy also had an aircraft carrier fighter plane training base, with storage of 350 spare planes at the base.

Pityilu Airfield
Based at Pityilu Airfield was:
VPB-146 (PV-1, Lockheed Ventura unit) 
ACORN 28
VJ-2 (JM-1 detachment Able, Martin B-26 Marauder unit)
Carrier Aircraft Service Unit 42 
Carrier Aircraft Service Unit 13

See also
Ponam Island

References

Background of US Navy Airfields on Ponam & Pityilu
Pityilu Airstrip

United States Navy
Seabees
Islands of Papua New Guinea
Manus Province